Thornton Fitzhugh (1864–1933) was an American architect.  Among his major works are the Beaux Arts and Romanesque Pacific Electric Building in downtown Los Angeles, California, and a number others which are listed on the U.S. National Register of Historic Places.

For part of his career he worked in a partnership, Fitzhugh, Krucker and Deckbar.

Works include:
Pacific Electric Building, (1902–1904), 610 S. Main St., downtown Los Angeles, CA
Highland Park Presbyterian Church #1, (1903), Highland Park neighborhood, Los Angeles, CA
Mayfair Apartments, (1906), Los Angeles, CA
Bank of Highland Park Building, (1906), Highland Park neighborhood Los Angeles, CA
Mrs. J.H. Newell and Miss Anna B. Clarkson House, (1907), Los Angeles, CA 
S.R. Jordan House, (1908) Venice neighborhood, Los Angeles, CA
Watkins and Belden Hotel Project, (1913), Los Angeles, CA
Trinity Auditorium Building, (1911–1914), Los Angeles, CA 
Rialto Pacific Electric Station, (1914–1915), Rialto, CA
Cooper Arms Apartments, (1923), Long Beach, CA
G.E. Noll Building, Phoenix, Arizona, NRHP-listed
Glendale Woman's Club Clubhouse, 7032 N. 56th Ave. Glendale, Arizona, NRHP-listed
First Presbyterian Church (San Luis Obispo, California) (1904)

His brother Lee Mason Fitzhugh was also a noted architect who designed the First United Methodist Church, Glendale, AZ

References

20th-century American architects
19th-century American architects
1864 births
1933 deaths